Amurosaurus ("Amur lizard") is a genus of lambeosaurine hadrosaurid dinosaur found in the latest Cretaceous period (66 million years ago) of eastern Asia.

Discovery and naming
 
Russian paleontologists Yuri Bolotsky and Sergei Kurzanov first described and named this dinosaur in 1991. The generic name is derived from the Amur River and the Greek word sauros ("lizard"). The Amur (called Heilongjiang or "Black Dragon River" in Chinese) forms the border of Russia and China, and is near where this dinosaur's remains were found. There is one known species (A. riabinini), named in honor of the late Russian paleontologist Anatoly Riabinin, who conducted the first Russian expeditions to recover dinosaur remains in the Amur region in 1916 and 1917.

All fossils of Amurosaurus have been recovered from a single bonebed locality, discovered in 1984 within the city limits of Blagoveschensk in the Amur Oblast of far eastern Russia. This bonebed is found in the Udurchukan Formation, the oldest geologic formation in the Tsagayan Group of far eastern Russia and northeastern China. This formation is thought to belong to the Maastrichtian stage of the Late Cretaceous Period, and was deposited about 68 million years ago, or just prior to the Lancian faunal stage of North America. The sediments were laid down in the floodplain of a river, which transported the fossils, but only a short distance, judging by the randomly assorted, disarticulated, but well-preserved bones within the bonebed, including fragile skull elements. Only a small section of the bonebed has been uncovered, but 90% of the remains found so far belong to lambeosaurines like Amurosaurus, mostly juveniles, with the rest belonging to other taxa, such as the hadrosaurine Kerberosaurus. Theropod teeth are also abundant, and there are many toothmarks on the bones, made by predators or scavengers. This bonebed containing many specimens was unearthed in 2008.
 
The holotype, or original specimen, consists of only a maxilla (upper jaw bone), and a dentary (lower jaw bone), both from the left side of the same individual. However, most of the other bones of the skull and skeleton have also been preserved in the bonebed, albeit of many different individuals. This other material was described more recently, making Amurosaurus the most abundant and completely known Russian dinosaur.

A pathological ulna of a specimen of Amurosaurus riabinini, preserved with a hypertrophied and swollen distal region and with the distal articular surface engulfed within a large overgrowth of newly formed bone, was described from the Maastrichtian Udurchukan Formation (Amur Region, Russia) by Bertozzo et al. (2022), who interpreted the bone as still healing prior to the animal's death, with the misalignment of the fracture and the resulting malunion of the two fragments of the bone probably causing the animal to limp and walk on three limbs.

Description
 
Amurosaurus is characterized by many autapomorphies, or unique features, of the skull, as well as the sigmoidal shape of the ulna (a lower arm bone) when viewed from the front or side. Most other known lambeosaurines have hollow crests on the top of their skulls, and although the bones that would make up such a crest are unknown in this dinosaur, the bones of the roof of the skull are modified to support one, so it can be assumed that Amurosaurus was crested as well.

Classification
The following cladogram on the left shows the results of a phylogenetic analysis of lambeosaur relationships from a 2013 study by Albert Prieto-Márquez and colleagues, showing Amurosaurus as a derived member of the tribe Lambeosaurini. The cladogram on the right depicts the results from a 2014 study by Yuri Bolotsky and colleagues; this study incorporated novel skull material of Amurosaurus which they found to indicate a more primitive spot among lambeosaurs.

 

The 2020 osteological description of the material previously constituting the distinct genus Sahaliyania found the latter genus to be a synonym of Amurosaurus, allowing its newly restudied material to contribute to more robust tests of the classification of Amurosaurus. With this new data, Amurosaurus was found to be a derived member of Lambeosaurinae closely related to Lambeosaurus, something that had been recovered in some previous studies. The cladogram from this study is reproduced below:

See also
 Timeline of hadrosaur research

References

Late Cretaceous dinosaurs of Asia
Lambeosaurines
Fossil taxa described in 1991
Taxa named by Sergei Kurzanov
Maastrichtian genus first appearances
Maastrichtian genus extinctions
Ornithischian genera